Stenalia aethiopica is a beetle in the genus Stenalia of the family Mordellidae. It was described in 1968.

References

aethiopica
Beetles described in 1968